The following television-related events took place during 1961.



Events
January 20 – John F. Kennedy is the first U.S. president to be inaugurated with a color telecast. NBC covers the inauguration in color.
January 25 
John F. Kennedy holds the first live televised presidential press conference.
Danger Man (United Kingdom) (1960–1961, 1964–1966) is cancelled due to lack of interest from Australian broadcasters. The series will be revived later.
February 19 – CFTM-TV, future flagship station of Quebec's TVA network, begins broadcasting in Montreal.
March 1 - Venevision officially renamed from Televisa of Venezuela.
April 11 – The Eichmann trial is the first televised trial, shown on a one-day delay basis in the U.S. with videotape flown in daily from Jerusalem
April 29 
Westward Television, the first ITV franchise for South West England, begins broadcasting.
Wide World of Sports debuts on the American Broadcasting Company.
May 5 – Alan B. Shepard is the first U.S. astronaut in space aboard the spacecraft Freedom 7 in a 15-min. suborbital flight. The launch is watched by 45 million U.S. viewers.
May 9 – In a speech on "Television and the Public Interest" to the National Association of Broadcasters in the United States, Federal Communications Commission chairman Newton N. Minow describes commercial television programming as a "vast wasteland" and tells the broadcasters that they could do a better job of serving the public.
May 29 – Dave Garroway announces his decision to quit the Today show on NBC in the United States.
July 1 – The soap opera series The Brighter Day airs its first episode after taping locations are moved from New York City to Los Angeles. As a result, key character Babby Dennis and her love interest are written out of the series; the actors who played them didn't want to relocate.
July 21 – Dicon Television Canal 11, as predecessor for Telefe, a major television network in Argentina, starts its first official regular broadcasting service from Buenos Aires.
September 1 – Border Television, the ITV franchise for the English-Scottish Border and Isle of Man, begins broadcasting.
September 23 – NBC begins its long-running NBC Saturday Night at the Movies participating, with a broadcast of the 1953 Marilyn Monroe picture How to Marry a Millionaire.
September 30 – Grampian Television, the ITV franchise for North East Scotland, begins broadcasting.
October 1 – CTV Television Network (CTV) is launched in Canada, the first privately owned network in the country.
October 29 - DZBB-TV Channel 7, the fourth television station in the Philippines owned by Republic Broadcasting System (modern-day GMA Network) of American war correspondent Robert "Uncle Bob" Stewart, is launched after the success of radio station DZBB.
November 4 – Radiotelevisione italiana's second television channel, Rete 2 (later named Rai 2), first broadcasts to 52% of the available households in Italy.
November 19 – Lucille Ball marries Gary Morton in New York City.
December 15 – Sam and Friends broadcasts its last episode in the United States.
December 31
 Raidió Teilifís Éireann (RTÉ) starts television broadcasts, bringing television to the Republic of Ireland for the first time.
 KBS1, a major television station in South Korea, starts its first regular broadcasting service from Seoul.
 WBNB airs the first television broadcast in the Virgin Islands. (The station would be destroyed by Hurricane Hugo in 1989.)

Debuts
January 5 – Mister Ed on CBS (1961–1966)
January 7 – The Avengers on ITV in UK (1961–1969)
January 23 – The Americans on NBC
January 30 - The Yogi Bear Show in syndication (1961-1962)
February 27 - Acapulco on NBC (1961) 
March 17 – Five Star Jubilee on NBC
April 3 – Minna no Uta on NHK
Mat 26 – Inspector Hornleigh Intervenes on West Germany's WDR
June 4 – Sportschau on ARD
April 29 – ABC's Wide World of Sports (1961–2006)
August 19 – Four Corners, Australia's first current affairs program (1961–present)
September 9 – The Jo Stafford Show on ITV (1961)
September 17 – Car 54, Where Are You? on NBC (1961–1963)
September 26 - Ichabod and Me on CBS (1961-1962)
September 27 - Top Cat on ABC (1961-1962) 
September 28 – Hazel on NBC (1961–1966)
October 1 – 
Bus Stop on ABC (1961–1962)
CTV National News (1961–present)
Songs of Praise on BBC (1961–present)
October 2 –
Ben Casey on ABC (1961–1966)
Password on CBS (1961–1967)
Window on Main Street on CBS (1961–1962)
October 3 – The Dick Van Dyke Show on CBS (1961–1966)
October 4 –
The Alvin Show on CBS (1961–1962)
Playdate on CBC (Canada) (1961–1964)
October 5
The Investigators (1961)
The New Bob Cummings Show (1961–1962)
October 6 – Straightaway (1961–1962)
October 7 – It's Academic (1961–present)
October 30 – The News with Uncle Bob (1961-1972)
November 8 – KVN (Клуб, Весёлых и Находчивых, Klub Vesyólykh i Nakhódchivykh, "Club of the Funny and Inventive") on The First Channel in the Soviet Union (1961–1972, 1986–present)
November 13 – Camera Canada on CBC Television (1961-1963)
December 11 – The Mike Douglas Show (1961–1981)
December 31 – RTÉ News: Nine O'Clock on RTÉ One

Programs/programmes
Alfred Hitchcock Presents (1955–1962)
American Bandstand (1952–1989)
Armchair Theatre (UK) (1956–1968)
As the World Turns (1956–2010)
Blue Peter (UK) (1958–present)
Bonanza (1959–1973)
Bozo the Clown (1949–present)
Bringing Up Buddy, 1960–1961
Candid Camera (1948–present)
Captain Kangaroo (1955–1984)
Carols by Candlelight (1952–present)
Cheyenne (1955–1962)
Come Dancing (UK) (1949–1995)
Coronation Street (UK) (1960–present)
Danger Man (UK) (1960–1961, 1964–1966)
Dixon of Dock Green (UK) (1955–1976)
Face the Nation (1954–present)
Grandstand (UK) (1958–2007)
Gunsmoke (1955–1975)
Hallmark Hall of Fame (1951–present)
Hancock's Half Hour (1956–1962)
Hato no kyujitsu (1953-2001)
Hawaiian Eye (1959–1963)
Inspector Hornleigh Intervenes (West Germany) (1961)
Juke Box Jury (1959–1967, 1979, 1989–1990)
Leave It to Beaver (1957–1963)
Love of Life (1951–1980)
Margie, 1961–1962
Meet the Press (1947–present)
My Three Sons (1960–1972)
Dagsrevyen (1958–present)
Opportunity Knocks (UK) (1956–1978)
Panorama (UK) (1953–present)
Rocky and His Friends (1959-1961) ends earlier in 1961 to resume later in 1961 on NBC as The Bullwinkle Show (1961–1964)
Search for Tomorrow (1951–1986)
The Adventures of Ozzie and Harriet (1952–1966)
The Andy Griffith Show (1960–1968)
The Alvin Show (1961-1962)
The Bell Telephone Hour (1959–1968)
The Bugs Bunny Show (1960-2000)
The Donna Reed Show (1958–1966)
The Ed Sullivan Show (1948–1971)
The Edge of Night (1956–1984)
The Flintstones (1960–1966)
The Good Old Days (UK) (1953–1983)
The Guiding Light (1952–2009)
The Huckleberry Hound Show (1958–1962)
The Jack Benny Show (1950–1965)
The Lawrence Welk Show (1955–1982)
The Milton Berle Show (1954–1967)
The Price Is Right (1956–1965)
The Quick Draw McGraw Show (1959–1962)
The Secret Storm (1954–1974)
The Sky at Night (UK) (1957–present)
The Yogi Bear Show (1961-1962)
The Today Show (1952–present)
The Tonight Show (1954–present)
The Twilight Zone (1959–1964, 1985–1989, 2002–2003)
The Voice of Firestone (1949–1963)
This Is Your Life (UK) (1955–2003)
Top Cat (1961-1962)
Truth or Consequences (1950–1988)
Walt Disney Presents (1958–1961) ends on September 17 to resume on September 24 on NBC as Walt Disney's Wonderful World of Color (1961–1969)
What the Papers Say (UK) (1956–2008)
What's My Line (1950–1967)
WIN News (1960–present)
Window on Main Street (1961–1962)
Zoo Quest (UK) (1954–1964)

Ending this year

Changes of network affiliation

Births

Deaths

Television Debuts
James Caan – Route 66
Dabney Coleman – Naked City
Gene Hackman – Tallahassee 7000
John Hurt – Probation Officer

See also
 1961–62 United States network television schedule

References